A muletta is a variety of Portuguese fishing trawler, a sailing ship used to catch fish by means of large nets. Its carvel-built hull, sail plan, and rigging are unusual for a sailing vessel: the hull is slightly concave along the keel, allowing the ship to be beached upright and giving it a greater draught when tipped ("heeled") than when upright, the bows are nearly always painted with large eyes (a holdover from the Ancient Greek practice of doing so), and it has a series of small spikes above the waterline at the stem in a curved vertical row; it is principally lateen rigged on its single short mast, but forward of this it carries a number of square rigged sails called water sails which project from two additional mast-like spars and which reach nearly to the water, and behind the mast it has a long low boom to which is attached the clew of an additional triangular sail as well as the clew of a second triangular sail, both fore-and-aft rigged.

References

Sailing rigs and rigging
Trawlers